John "Jack" Burns (7 January 1859 – 18 December 1927), a native of St Andrews, was a Scottish professional golfer for part of his life.  He was the son of an Irish labourer, and started earning his living as a plasterer.  However, there is reference to him being a professional golfer in the minutes of the St Andrews Golf Club in October 1885.

Burns moved to Warwick, England in 1887 to become the golf professional and greenskeeper at the newly formed Warwickshire Golf Club (now known as Warwick Golf Centre), the first golf club in Warwickshire. Burns returned to Scotland in October 1888 to become the winner of the Open Championship, which was held at the Old Course at St Andrews. The £8 prize of his major championship title accomplishment did not make him a fortune. He returned to his job in Warwick and was involved in the creation of the neighbouring golf course in Kenilworth in 1890.

He moved back to St Andrews in 1891 to work on the railways, but he carried on caddying. When he died in 1927, his profession was listed as a plasterer again.

Major championships

Wins (1)

Results timeline

Note: Burns only played in The Open Championship.
DNP = Did not play
CUT = missed the half-way cut
"T" indicates a tie for a place
Green background for wins. Yellow background for top-10

References

External links
Details of the 1888 Open from the official site

Scottish male golfers
Winners of men's major golf championships
British golf instructors
Plasterers
Golfers from St Andrews
1859 births
1927 deaths